Idiomictis is a genus of moths of the family Xyloryctidae.

Species
 Idiomictis aneuropa Meyrick, 1935
 Idiomictis rhizonoma Meyrick, 1935

References

Xyloryctidae
Xyloryctidae genera